Trygve Madsen (born 15 February 1940) is a Norwegian composer and pianist.

Early life and education
Born in Fredrikstad, Madsen demonstrated musical ability at an early age when he began to learn to play the piano at age six and first started composing aged seven. Madsen went on to study under Egil Hovland and Erik Werba, and developed an interest in everything from the Russian masters Prokofiev and Shostakovich to the works of Bach, Haydn, Mozart, Verdi, Tchaikovsky, Richard Strauss, and Ravel. Madsen's personal interest in playing jazz piano and the influence that pianists such as Art Tatum, Erroll Garner and Oscar Peterson had on him can be heard in his use of the piano.

Career
Trygve Madsen has proven himself to be a prolific worker and particularly one of the most productive published by Musikk-Husets Forlag – in 2009, the company had 125 works by Madsen in their catalogue. The composer has become increasingly well known of late which has perhaps largely to do with the inclusion of his work in music syllabuses around the world - the Associated Board of the Royal Schools of Music included the Prelude and Fugue in C (Opus 101) as one of the optional pieces for Grade 8 pianists, and in 2009 The Dream of the Rhinoceros was used as an obligatory piece at a national horn competition in Poland. Aside from printed music, the composer has also had his work featured on thirty-six CDs, eight of which were solely dedicated to his work.

Madsen’s compositions have seen performances in Argentina, Australia, Belgium Colombia, Denmark, England, France, Italy, Japan, Switzerland, Sweden, the Czech Republic, USA and Austria. Several of his works are included in the curriculum at a number of educational institutions at home and abroad.

Madsen has written a number of commissioned works, including the opera Circus Terra written for the Norwegian National Opera and Ballet, premiered in Prague in 2002 and also performed at the 2002 Ultima Oslo Contemporary Music Festival. In commemoration of Norway’s centenary marking of independence, Madsen received a commission from the Norwegian Parliament. The resulting work, the opera Aurora, was premiered at the Halden Fort in June 2005. For the 200th anniversary of the US Military Academy of Music in New York, Madsen wrote two commissioned works: Quintet for brass Op. 120 and Concerto Grosso for brass ensemble and percussion Op. 121.  Madsen’s Concertino for Horn and Orchestra is a work commissioned by the French Government by the then Minister of Culture Jaques Lang and premiered in 1984 in Dijon.

Production

Selected works
 Einladung zu eine Reise mit Mozart und vier Hornisten
 Konzert für Trompete und Orchester
 Circus Terra, an opera with libretto by Jon Bing
 Suite for Flute and Piano, Op. 2
 Sonata for Horn and Piano, Op. 24, commissioned by the French government
 Concerto #1 for Piano and Orchestra, Op. 27
 Sextet for Piano and Brass Quintet, Op. 32
 Sonata for viola and piano, Op. 33
 Sonata for Tuba and Piano, Op. 34, dedicated to Roger Bobo
 Concerto for Tuba and Orchestra, Op. 35, dedicated to Michael Lind
 Divertimento for Horn, Tuba, and Piano, Op. 43
 Concertino for Horn and Orchestra, Op. 45
 Divertimento for Brass Band and Percussion, Op. 47
 Introduction and Allegro for Tuba Solo and Symphonic Band, Op. 50
 Symphony #1, Op. 54
 Concerto for Euphonium and Orchestra, Op. 55
 Music to an Exhibition for 2 Trumpets, Horn, 2 Euphoniums, and Tuba, Op. 59
 Symphony #2, Op. 66
 The Mysterious Barricades II for Trumpet, Horn, Tuba, and Piano, Op. 82
 Tuba Marmalade for Euphonium/Tuba Quartet, Op. 84
 Brass Marmalade for Brass Band, Op. 85
 Sonata for Trumpet and Piano, Op. 90
 The Dream of the Rhinoceros, for solo horn, Op. 92
 Sonata for Euphonium and Piano, Op. 97
 24 Preludes and Fugues, Op. 101
 De Fire Riker, for solo oboe
 Aurora, opera

Discography
 Det Norske Fløyteensemble, From Norway (2011)
 Fredrik Fors, Sveinung Bjelland, Black Bird (2009)
 Jens Harald Bratlie, Trygve Madsen: 24 Preludes & Fugues (2006)
 Alexander Vitlin, Alina Luschtschizkaja, Apostolos Palios, Julia Severus, Mare - Two Pianos Four Pianists (2006)
 Tori Stødle, Pianomusts (2006)
 Frøydis Ree Wekre, Ceros (2005)
 Sketches of Norway (2004)
 Arild Stav, Dawn (2001)
 Frédérique Lagarde, Odile Sordoillet, The Saxophones (2001)
 Sonatas, Marmalades & Faxes, with Philippe Duchesne (bass saxophone), Quatuor Jean Ledieu, Alain Jousset (tenor saxophone), Frédérique Lagarde (piano), Philippe Portejoie (alto saxophone), Quatuor De Clarinettes Francilien, Sylvie Hue (clarinet) and Roger Boutry (piano), Hemera (Naxos), HCD2921 (1997)
 Frode Thorjussen, Nora Kulset, Eplemann!  (1997)
 Jens Harald Bratlie, Trygve Madsen: Piano Works (1996)
 Frøydis Ree Wekre, Songs of the Wolf (1996)
 Brynjar Hoff, The Contemporary Oboe (1996)
 Frøydis Ree Wekre, Corno di Norvegia (1994)
 Øystein Baadsvik, Hindemith, Madsen, Gaathaug (1993)
 Skandinaviska Brassensemblen, Brass Festival (1985)
 Brynjar Hoff, Per Dreier, Brynjar Hoff (1982)
 Brynjar Hoff, Kaare Ørnung, Great Music for Oboe (1979)

References

External links 

1940 births
Composers for piano
Living people
Norwegian classical composers
Norwegian classical pianists
Norwegian opera composers
Norwegian male classical composers
Norwegian male pianists
21st-century classical pianists
21st-century Norwegian male musicians
Musicians from Fredrikstad